Saint-Brisson is a commune in the Nièvre department in central France.

Points of interest
Herbularium du Morvan

See also
Communes of the Nièvre department
Parc naturel régional du Morvan

References 

Communes of Nièvre